Nadia Barentin (17 October 1936 – 22 March 2011) was a French actress, known for her theatre and film roles, including Les Blessures assassines in 2000.

She was nominated for the Molière Award for Best Supporting Actress for Monsieur Klebs et Rosalie in 1993.

Selected filmography
 1979 : Heroes Are Not Wet Behind the Ears, directed by Charles Nemes
 1994 : Coming to Terms with the Dead, directed by Pascale Ferran
 1998 : Un grand cri d'amour, directed by Josiane Balasko

Death
Barentin died on 22 March 2011, aged 74, from undisclosed causes.

References

External links

1936 births
2011 deaths
French stage actresses
French film actresses
Actresses from Paris
20th-century French actresses
21st-century French actresses
French television actresses